Major General  Gustav Henry "Gus" Franke (September 7, 1888 – March 19, 1953) was a career United States Army officer, who served during World Wars I and II.

Biography
Gustav H. Franke was born in Wisconsin and moved to Iowa on September 7, 1888.  His father, Gustave Henry Franke, was a tailor in Manning, Iowa.

"Gus" Franke was an honors graduate of the United States Military Academy, class of 1911.  He graduated 12th in a class of 83.  One of Franke's classmates at West Point was future general Terry Allen, until Allen's academic difficulties led to his dismissal from the military academy.  Another distinguished classmate was Walton Walker, who would rise to Lieutenant General and command the Eighth Army in Korea during the desperate times of 1950.

Franke served much of his career in the Field Artillery Branch.  Franke was commander of the first US unit (Artillery) to engage the Germany Army in World War I as the American forces moved forward.  In the years leading up to World War II, Franke was the commanding officer of the 2nd Field Artillery Regiment from 1937 to 1940.  He moved to Commandant of the Field Artillery Replacement Center at Fort Bragg in 1941.  From 1941 to 1942, Franke was the commanding officer of Artillery for the 6th Infantry Division.

With the advent of the United States involvement in World War II, General Franke became the commander of the 81st Infantry Division at Fort Rucker, Alabama, from its reactivation in June 1942 until August 1942. During this time Gen. Franke was responsible for the construction and establishment of Ft. Rucker as a major facility as the home and training center for the 81st Infantry Division.  He was succeeded at the 81st by Major General Paul J. Mueller.

During the summer of 1943 Franke became ill and was hospitalized for several months in Atlanta, Georgia.

Franke was a member of the War Department Dependency Board from 1943 to 1944.

Major General Franke retired from the Army in 1944.

His son, Gustav H. Franke Jr., was also an army officer and served in World War II and the Korean War where he was awarded a Silver Star.  Like his father, he was a career artillery officer, eventually retiring from the Army in 1965.  After he completed courses at Duke University, he became a professor at Hampden-Sydney College in Virginia.  He also had a son that followed in his grandfather and father's steps.  Gustav W. Franke served as an Army Aviator and Engineer officer.  He was awarded the Distinguished Flying Cross during the Vietnam War.  Later in his career he headed up the United States Department of Defense Key Asset Protection Program during the First Gulf War and retired in 1996 as a colonel.

References
World War II Divisional Combat Chronicles; retrieved 5/7/09 
Short Bio for Gen. Franke; retrieved 5/7/09
Article in Manning Monitor; retrieved 5/7/09
NY Times Article regarding West Point Graduation for 1911 Class; retrieved 5/7/09
The Coldest Winter: America and the Korean War;  David Halberstam;  Edition: illustrated;  Hyperion, 2007 , 978-1-4013-0052-4 pg. 157
Generals of World War II

1888 births
1953 deaths
United States Army Field Artillery Branch personnel
Military personnel from Wisconsin
United States Army personnel of World War I
United States Military Academy alumni
United States Army generals of World War II
United States Army generals
United States Army War College alumni